Platyallabes tihoni is the only species in the genus Platyallabes of catfishes (order Siluriformes) of the family Clariidae. This species is found in the Malebo Pool. P. tihoni has a body plan that is intermediate to the generalized, fusiform (torpedo-shaped) type such as Clarias species and the anguilliform (eel-shaped) type such as Gymnallabes. This species is known to grow up to 52.8 centimetres (20.8 in) TL.

References

Clariidae
Fish of Africa
Fauna of the Republic of the Congo
Taxa named by Max Poll
Fish described in 1944